A trapdoor is a door set into a floor or ceiling.

Trapdoor or Trap Door may also refer to:

 Trap Door (magazine), a science fiction fanzine
 The Trap Door, a British animated TV series
 The Trap Door (video game), a computer game based on the animated series
 Trapdoor (software), a piece of computer software used for network administration
 Trapdoor (company), a video game developer
 Trapdoor function, a type of mathematical function used in cryptography
 "Trapdoor", in computing, an outdated synonym for "backdoor", a method used to circumvent normal authorization
 Trap Door (EP), an EP by T-Bone Burnett, or the title song
 "Trap Door", a song by Ozzy Osbourne from Black Rain
 "Trap Door" Springfield, a single-shot breechloading rifle designed and produced at Springfield Armory during the late 19th century.
 Trapdoor spider, a spider
 Trap Door Spiders, a literary society 
 Trapdoor mechanism for breech loading rifles 
 "Trapdoor", a song by Twenty One Pilots from their self-titled album
 "Trapdoor", a song by King Gizzard & the Lizard Wizard from their album Paper Mâché Dream Balloon.